Gole is a surname. Notable people with the surname include:

 Aniruddha M. Gole (21st century), Indian Canadian engineering professor
 Fereydun Gole (1942–2005), Iranian screenwriter, film director, and film editor
 Padma Gole (1913–1998), Indian poet

See also
 Gore (surname)